Eva Hannesdóttir (born 3 December 1987 in Reykjavík) is an Icelandic freestyle swimmer. She competed in the 4 × 100 metre medley relay event at the 2012 Summer Olympics.

References

1987 births
Living people
Eva Hannesdottir
Eva Hannesdottir
Swimmers at the 2012 Summer Olympics
Eva Hannesdottir
21st-century Icelandic women